Until We Have Faces is the third studio album by American Christian rock band Red. It was released on February 1, 2011 through Essential Records and Sony Records. It was produced by Rob Graves. It is the first album the band released with four members, due to the absence of Jasen Rauch (although Rauch still contributed to songwriting).

Production and recording
The band released a teaser video on Facebook via YouTube featuring the band name on a sheet of parchment, which burned away, revealing the album title. Unfortunately the music in this teaser video was not in any song on the album. Vocalist Michael Barnes stated on his Facebook page that the new album will be produced by Rob Graves, who also produced the first two albums. A picture was recently posted on producer Rob Graves Twitter account showing three guitars with tape on them showing tunings of A#, A, and G#, which hints that this record may be heavier than the previous two. They also confirmed on their Facebook page that the new album will contain 11 tracks, and a 12th bonus track called "Until We Have Faces" will be available only from iTunes preorder.

Promotion and release
On December 9, 2010, the song "Feed the Machine" was sent to all fans who submitted their face as part of the hype for the new album. The cover art has been revealed. On December 20, RED posted a download to the radio edit of "Faceless" for a limited time. "Faceless" was released to radio on December 31, 2010, as the first single from the album. A full track-listing along with 30-second previews for each song on the Christian Book Distributors website, Christianbook.com. The band released a promotional mosaic for the album, made-up of the fan-submitted pictures. A European edition titled, "Until We Have Faces [World Edition]" was released on July 5, 2011.

Reception

Critical

Until We Have Faces received generally positive reviews, although critics claimed that it didn't match up to the band's previous album, Innocence & Instinct.

Allmusic's Gregory Heaney said, "blending the plaintive, often reflective sound of post-grunge with a metal edge, Red's third album, Until We Have Faces, finds the band making its most polished album yet." Heaney wrote, "While there’s always a danger of bands going stale, the gamble seems to have paid off here for them, and the album shows a band whose sound is as sweeping and heavy as it's ever been, making this an album that's sure to please longtime fans and make an easy convert out of anyone looking for some new post-grunge heaviness."

Alpha Omega News' Elise graded the album an A, and wrote that, "musically, 'Until We Have Faces' is more an extension of 'Innocence and Insinct' as opposed to a follow-up.  It has strong guitars and melodies and the same rough edges listeners have come to expect from Red.  Lyrically, however, the band has delved deeper and darker than before.  The album's theme of being faceless and struggling to find your true identity is easily relatable for most listeners". Elise wrote, "although at first I was unsure if 'Until We Have Faces' could measure up to the standards set by Red's previous two releases, I was pleasantly surprised by how far it exceeded expectations. It will definitely go down as the next installment of Red's strong musical record."

Alt Rock Live's Jonathan Faulkner wrote, "With all of this it is safe to say that Red is quickly working their way into the list of great Christian rock groups that are out on the market today. They have a solid message, a strong lineup of musicians and now it would seem a household name and an album that we will still be listening to years down the road."

CCM Magazines Matt Conner said, "[the album] serves up a modern rock feast". Conner wrote, "[the album] cements Red as one of the rock music staples for the next decade."

Christian Manifesto's Kyle Kiekintveld said, "[the album] is unsurprisingly a great album from an oddly underrated band outside of Christian circles. The only real question for Red and this album is whether they will have any luck winning the illusive Rock Gospel Grammy. This album is deserving of it but with every passing year more new artists join the already crowded field and the average quality of Christian Rock albums greatly increases. This is a must have album for fans of this genre and is easily a good gateway album for those who are curious about the genre as a whole."

Christian Manifesto's J.F. Arnold wrote, "all in all, I’m sad that I missed their second album after hearing this one.  This album has gotten more play time in my car than I would have expected, and it is definitely a must-have for fans of Red or of the genre."

Christian Music Zine's Anthony Pronto said, "is good but doesn’t reach the knockout sound I wanted from a band I loved seeing live. Don’t get me wrong, the songs were all fine and this will probably bring RED more success, but more of a hard rock edge throughout their next album would definitely make that an album of the year candidate." On a side note, Pronto called the cover art "terrible".

Christian Rock 20's Paul Anthony said, "[the album] largely continues the successful formula of its first two releases." "I have faith that Red, an incredibly enjoyable rock band, also can do better. It has now produced essentially a 30-track, three-part album – an exceptional body of work for this young group." Anthony continued, "but the time has come to move forward, to walk that fine line by growing beyond the themes the band has developed so well – without forgetting them."

Christianity Today'''s Ron Augustine said, "Red rehashes the same riffs that Linkin Park achieved fame with over a decade ago, but with considerably less firepower." "Even though the album is named after a C. S. Lewis novel (Lewis's actual title is Till We Have Faces), lacks in creativity and thoughtfulness (things Lewis was never short on). Power chords are pounded out in common time until a piano and string bridge offers temporary serenity. It is formulaic and predictable, but some of the faster songs will probably work well in WWE or NFL highlight clips."

Cross Rhythms' Steven Bridge said, "this is a continuation of the Pennsylvania-based band's trademark sound, with a haunting, sometimes dark and ethereal tone that seeps through the songs but always with portholes of hope". "If you enjoyed Red's earlier projects, this certainly won't disappoint."

Jesus Freak Hideout's Nathaniel Schexnayder said, "with this latest release, they have cemented the fact that they are one of the best rock acts around. However, Until We Have Faces doesn't go too many places that Innocence & Instinct didn’t. With that said, sound lyrics and great music have made RED’s third project good, if not even great."

Jesus Freak Hideout's Michael Weaver wrote, "the result lands somewhere in between their debut, End of Silence, and their highly successful sophomore album, Innocence & Instinct." "Another solid outing and is sure to bring more success to the band in both the Christian and secular markets."

Louder Than The Music's Jono Davies said, "if heavy hard rock is your genre of music, Until We Have Faces is an album worth checking out. The hard hitting lyrics that rings out through the songs show that this isn't a band masking their creativity with big distorted guitars, this is a band who have written down words that mean something to them and maybe something to you too."

Melodic.net's Kaj Roth said, "I can only come to the conclusion that this band wants to be super safe and deliver the same album over and over again except this time the songs do not match either "End of silence" (2006) nor "Innocence and instinct" (2009)." "This feels like a huge Hollywood movie, a big budget, lots of special effects but the story is thin and you know the hero will get the girl in the end. 4 stars for the production but 2 stars for the songs, I sure do hope Red dare to try something new on the next album or else I will drop this band."

New Release Tuesday's Kevin Davis said that he was "so impressed by the music and production mingling the harder rock guitars, soft strings and the emotive vocals of Mike Barnes". "[It] is the crowning achievement by this incredible rock band and will certainly be among my top albums of 2011."

New Release Tuesday's Jonathan Francesco wrote, "all in all, Red has crafted a catchy and memorable melodic rock album that will surely find  way onto many 'Best of' lists come year's end, even though  release comes in February. If Red can keep this up, they surely got a bright career ahead of them in the industry."

TheNewReview's Jonathan Anderson said, "[the album] has been one those reminders. Its heartfelt lyrics are filled with hope, if we choose to find it. It reminds me that I’m not alone. Despite life’s difficulties, the best is yet to come. Life really isn’t all that bad; it’s actually pretty awesome. And I’m privileged to have such incredible music as Until We Have Faces grace my ears with its audible beauty." "Every song has its place and purpose. Red has pulled together yet another fantastic release. Their methods have not changed, but have merely been tweaked and perfected. The use of orchestra instruments is perfectly incorporated. The message is bold and honestly placed. Until We Have Faces is heavy and beautiful, and is my favorite release from Red to date."ONCOURSE MAGAZINEs Shannon Zabroski said, "[the band with this album] erupts into your ears with the same aural authority as their first two highly-acclaimed releases. Lofty expectations following a duo of successful albums can be tough satisfy, but RED pulls it off while breaking plenty of sweat." Zabroski wrote that "Red continues to impress with lyrical maturity and an addictive signature sound. For better or worse, they met the standard set by their previous GRAMMY-awarded releases. This might sound like faint praise, but in this case, it is a reason to be flattered."

Sputnikmusic's staff reviewer Jared Ponton said, "[this] is that mid-career mainstream rock album that is bound to keep Red alive financially but will aggravate critics and fans, to an extent. The band is recycling itself, not just the elements of its sound, which is welcome and expected, but in the area of its songwriting. Nearly half or more of Until We Have Faces sounds tired and generic, which is something Red fans are not used to when it comes to the band's albums."

Bracket and Bracket's Kyzer Davis said, "[this album contains] Epic rhythm guitars and purely amazing instrumentals including pianos, violins, synths and the distinct Red yell that the lead singers does. This was an amazing album just like the first two. If you have never heard Red I suggest getting this album or any of their albums because you will be amazed that every song is composed very well. A band that can write well rounded songs is hard to find and Red sure know how to do just that. I recommend it, Go now, get this!"

The guitarist John Petrucci from the band Dream Theater has considered this album the best album of the year 2011.

Track listing

Music videos
On April 25, 2011, Red started shooting for the music video "Feed the Machine". Fans were asked to come as extras for a scene in the video. The second music video, "Lie to Me" was shot the following day. Both videos were produced by Dan Atchison and directed by The Erwin Brothers. "Feed the Machine" was released on June 6, 2011. RED posted clips from the "Feed the Machine" video on their Facebook and YouTube pages before it was released. The music video for "Lie to Me (Denial)" was premiered on July 7, 2011, on Noisecreep. Red announced that they would be making a music video for "Not Alone" using fan submissions of how the song has impacted their life or a life of someone they know.

Personnel
Information gathered from the digital Until We Have Faces extended booklet.

Red
 Michael Barnes – lead vocals
 Anthony Armstrong – guitars, backing vocals
 Randy Armstrong – bass, backing vocals, piano
 Joe Rickard – drums, percussion

Production and recording
 Rob Graves – producer, drum producer, engineer
 Jason McArthur – executive producer
 Jasen Rauch – engineer, drum producer, additional production
 Ben Grosse – mixing
 Paul Pavao – mixing assistant
 Tom Baker – mastering at Precision Mastering, Los Angeles
 Paragon Studios, Franklin, Tennessee – drum recording location
 Fred Paragano – drum engineer
 Brian Calhoon – drum engineer
 Little Big Sound, Bellevue, Tennessee – string recording location
 Baeho "Bobby" Shin – string engineer
 Ben "Snake" Schmidt – additional digital editor, engineer
 Paragon Studios, Franklin, Tennessee – string recording location ("Feed the Machine", "Let It Burn" and "Lie to Me (Denial)")
 Fred Paragano – string engineer
 Brian Calhoon – string engineer
 Jim Gray – conducting and music prep
 Ian Roberts – assistant to Rob Graves

Additional musicians
 Mark Holman – additional background vocals
 Kerrie Roberts – additional background vocals (courtesy of Reunion Records)
 Mike Seminari – additional background vocals
 William Tant – choir
 Margaret Tant – choir
 Chandler Hart – choir
 Sarah ValleyRose – choir
 Kira Hinchey – choir
 Lori Casteel – choir
 David Davidson – violin
 David Angell – violin
 Karen Winkelmann – violin
 Pamela Sixfin – violin
 Jim Grosjean – viola
 Monisa Angell – viola
 Kristin Wilkinson – viola
 Bruce Christensen – viola
 Elizabeth Lamb – viola
 Anthony Lamarchina – cello
 John Catchings – cello
 Sarighani Reist – cello
 Jack Jezioro – string bass

Artwork and design
 Joseph Anthony Baker – photography
 Red – additional photography, wardrobe styling
 John Clore – additional photography
 Jessica Katina – hair, make-up
 Beth Lee – art direction
 Tim Parker – art direction
 Tim Parker – design
 Michelle Box – A&R production
 Jason Root – A&R production

Chart performanceUntil We Have Faces'' debuted on the U.S. Billboard 200 chart at No. 2, with first week sales of around 43,000. Additionally, Red debuted at No. 1 on the following Nielsen SoundScan charts: Current Hard Music, Current Rock Music, Current Alternative, Christian Rock, Current Contemporary Christian Album and Record Label Independent charts. Further, Until We Have Faces remained in the Top 5 on both iTunes' Overall Album and Rock Album charts its entire first week. As of April 2011, the album has sold over 100,000 copies in the US.

Charts

Year-end charts

References

2011 albums
Red (American band) albums